This is a list of notable Nigerian comedians.

A
Abiodun Ayoyinka (born 1960)
Akpororo
Alibaba Akporobome (born 1965)
Ayo Makun (born 1971)

B
 Basketmouth (born 1978)
 Bovi (born 1979)
 Broda Shaggi (born 1993)
 Buchi (born 1979)

C
 Chigul (born 1976)
Chuks D General

E
 Emmanuella (born 2010)

F
 Frank D Don (born 1985)

H 
 Helen Paul (born 1983)

I
I Go Dye
I Go Save (born 1979)

K
 Kiriku

M
 Mark Angel (born 1991)
 MC Aproko
 MC Lively (born 1992)
Mr Macaroni (born 1993)

O
 Okey Bakassi (born 1969)

R 
 Real Warri Pikin (born 1990)

T
 Teju Babyface (born 1979)
 Taaooma (born 1999)
Twyse Ereme (born 1992)

Lists of comedians
Comedians
Comedians